Marion Junction, also known as Bridges, is an unincorporated community in Dallas County, Alabama.

References

Unincorporated communities in Alabama
Unincorporated communities in Dallas County, Alabama